Karen Roberts (born 26 October 1976) is a British former judoka, who competed in the 2000 Summer Olympics.

Judo career
Roberts won the bronze medal at the 1999 World Judo Championships in Birmingham, in the -63 kg category. In 2000, she was selected to represent Great Britain at the 2000 Summer Olympics in Sydney. Competing in the women's 63 kg category she reached the quarter finals.

In 2002, she had a triple success, winning the gold medal at the 2002 Commonwealth Games in Manchester, securing a silver medal at the 2002 European Judo Championships in Maribor and becoming champion of Great Britain, winning the half-middleweight division at the British Judo Championships. The following year in 2003, she successfully defended her British title.

References

1976 births
Living people
British female judoka
Olympic judoka of Great Britain
Judoka at the 2000 Summer Olympics
Commonwealth Games medallists in judo
Commonwealth Games gold medallists for England
Universiade medalists in judo
Judoka at the 2002 Commonwealth Games
Universiade silver medalists for Great Britain
Medalists at the 1999 Summer Universiade
Medallists at the 2002 Commonwealth Games